Mathry Road Halt railway station was on the Clarbeston Road and Letterston line of the Great Western Railway. It served the village of Letterston 1 mile to the south east, and on railway maps was suffixed for St David's. It was named Mathry when opened in 1923, and renamed the following year.

History
The Clarbeston Road and Letterston Railway, a subsidiary of the Great Western Railway (GWR), was opened on 30 August 1906, but at first there were no intermediate stations. However, there was a signal box at Wolf's Castle, because although most of the route was built as double track, a portion near the middle, which included Spittal Tunnel and the cutting through Treffgarne Gorge, was single-track, and it was necessary to have signal boxes at each end of the single-track section. The single-track section was later doubled, but although the temporary signal boxes at Spittal and Treffgarne closed with the introduction of full double-track working on 17 December 1906, Wolf's Castle signal box was retained to break the section, allowing two trains to proceed in the same direction between Clarbeston Road and Letterston simultaneously; there was also a crossover.

The signal box at Wolf's Castle Halt was taken out of use on 17 February 1925; it was transferred to Mathry Road.

The station closed on 6 April 1964, as did all the other stations between Clarbeston Road and Fishguard Harbour. The line remains open for services to Fishguard & Goodwick and Fishguard Harbour stations. Falling traffic on the line caused it to be reduced to single-track on 16 May 1971 with a passing loop at Letterston Junction.

Notes

References

External links

Disused railway stations in Pembrokeshire
Former Great Western Railway stations
Railway stations opened in 1923
Railway stations closed in 1964
Beeching closures in Wales
1923 establishments in Wales
Railway stations in Great Britain opened in the 20th century